Mar Maroon is the 4th full-length album by rock band 12012, released on March 11, 2009.

Track listing
The World
DNA
As
スマイルアゲイン  (Smile Again)
Merry Go World
Psycho Virus
逢いたいから.... (Aitai Kara...)
SYSTEM [0] DOWN
太陽  (Taiyō)
Generation
I Deal
Hallelujah -Album Ver.-
願い (Negai)

References

2009 albums
12012 albums